Celaenorrhinus pulomaya, commonly known as the multi-spotted flat, is a species of hesperiid butterfly found in Asia.

Range
The butterfly occurs in the Himalayas and western China.

Description

See also
Hesperiidae
List of butterflies of India (Pyrginae)
List of butterflies of India (Hesperiidae)

References

Print

Online

pulomaya
Fauna of Pakistan